Saint-Denys de la Chapelle is a church of the 18th arrondissement of Paris. It is located in the neighborhood of La Chapelle along one of the oldest roads in Paris. The Rue de la Chapelle has existed since Gallo-Roman times, running from the suburb of Saint-Denis to the center of Paris.

Around 475 St. Genevieve purchased some land and built Saint-Denys de la Chapelle. In 636 on the orders of Dagobert I the relics of Saint Denis, a patron saint of France, were reinterred in the basilica. 

The existing church, completed in 1204, was built on the foundations of a chapel established by Saint Genevieve in 475, which housed the relics of Saint Denis until 636, when they were transferred to the Basilica of Saint-Denis. A legend states that Joan of Arc spent a night of prayer in the chapel in 1429. To commemorate this and to offer thanks for what was viewed as Joan's intervention in the first Battle of the Marne in 1914, the much larger Basilica of Sainte-Jeanne-d'Arc was built immediately adjacent, beginning in 1930.

External links 
 Parish of Saint-Denys de la Chapelle
 

Roman Catholic churches in the 18th arrondissement of Paris
Chemin Neuf Community